The 2008 Thénia bombing occurred on January 29, 2008 when a suicide bomber drove and detonated a vehicle laden with explosives into the headquarters of the Algerian police (BMPJ) in the town of Thénia, Boumerdès Province, Algeria killing 2 and injuring 23. The Al-Qaeda Organization in the Islamic Maghreb is suspected as being responsible.

See also
 Terrorist bombings in Algeria
List of terrorist incidents, 2008

References

Boumerdès Province
Suicide car and truck bombings in Algeria
Mass murder in 2008
Terrorist incidents in Algeria
Terrorist incidents in Algeria in 2008
2008 murders in Algeria
Islamic terrorism in Algeria